The following is a list of events effecting Philippine television in 1988. Events listed include television show debuts, finales, cancellations, and channel launches, closures and rebrandings, as well as information about controversies and carriage disputes.

Events
August 29: TV Patrol Central Visayas is launched on DYCB Channel 3, the first regional edition of the national TV Patrol newscast, airing an hour of national and local news at primetime until December, when it moves to late afternoons and its broadcast reduces to 30 minutes.
November 7: The Tower of Power transmitter was inaugurated by President Aquino and GMA Network executives. Afterwards, a TV special entitled "GMA-7 POWER" was shown to commemorate the event.
December 10: Following years of trial runs beginning in 1969, ABS-CBN switches on its debut nationwide satellite broadcast using the DOMSAT system, with a starting four-hour block of national programming aired to all provincial and/or regional stations nationwide.
December 12: Negros Occidental becomes second province to host a localized TV Patrol edition with the launch of TV Patrol Negros.

Premieres

Unknown
Jesus Miracle Crusade on GMA 7
Evelio on GMA 7
Kadenang Rosas on GMA 7
Pinoy Wrestling on PTV 4
Pag-ibig o Karangalan on ABS-CBN 2
Umiikot ang Kapalaran on ABS-CBN 2
Bedtime Stories on ABS-CBN 2
Discovery Drama Theater on ABS-CBN 2
Pinoy Fantasy on ABS-CBN 2
Teen Pan Alley on ABS-CBN 2
Dina on ABS-CBN 2
Morning Treats on ABS-CBN 2
Bahay Kalinga on ABS-CBN 2
Manila, Manila on ABS-CBN 2
Shaider on ABS-CBN 2
Rey Langit: The Philippine Connection on IBC 13
Seiko Supernatural Stories on IBC 13
Ayos Lang, Tsong! on IBC 13
Tic Tac Boom on IBC 13
Dance Tonight on IBC 13
Tanghalan ng Kampeon on GMA 7
Date a Star on GMA 7
Just for Fun on GMA 7
Veritas Monitors on GMA 7
Gideon 300 on GMA 7
Midnight Prayer Helps on GMA 7
Tinig sa Itaas on GMA 7
Banyuhay on RPN 9
Charo on RPN 9
Dear Manilyn on RPN 9
Muscles in Motion on RPN 9
Seiko TV Presents on RPN 9
Stir on RPN 9
Wari Waro on RPN 9
Bantay Kongreso on PTV 4
Diwa ng Katotohanan on PTV 4
Windows with Johnny Revilla on PTV 4
Oks na Oks on PTV 4

Programs transferring networks

Finales
February 27: Dance-2-Nite on ABS-CBN 2
February 28: The Sharon Cuneta Show on IBC 13
March 9: Loveliness on ABS-CBN 2
April 28: Napakasakit Kuya Eddie on ABS-CBN 2
April 30: Martin and Pops Twogether on ABS-CBN 2
November 26: Barrio Balimbing on ABS-CBN 2
 October 21
 Cinemascoop on ABS-CBN 2
 Kalatog sa Trese on IBC 13
October 30: Tawag ng Tanghalan on ABS-CBN 2
December 20: Rumors: Facts and Humors on ABS-CBN 2
December 24: Dance Tonight on IBC 13

Unknown date
October: Ang Bagong Kampeon on RPN 9

Unknown
Gintong Kristal on GMA 7
Evelio on GMA 7
Angkan on ABS-CBN 2
Bedtime Stories on ABS-CBN 2
Always, Snooky on ABS-CBN 2
Teen Pan Alley on ABS-CBN 2
Zsa Zsa on ABS-CBN 2
Talents Unlimited on ABS-CBN 2
Misis of the 80's on ABS-CBN 2
Children's Hour on ABS-CBN 2
Flordeluna: Book 2 on RPN 9
Rey Langit: The Philippine Connection on IBC 13
Tapatan Kay Luis Beltran on IBC 13
Viva Telecine sa 13 on IBC 13
Seiko Supernatural Stories on IBC 13
Ayos Lang, Tsong! on IBC 13
Chicks for Cats on IBC 13
Pubhouse on IBC 13
Tic Tac Boom on IBC 13
Jesus Miracle Crusade on IBC 13
Sining Siete on GMA 7
Shades on GMA 7
Late Night with June & Johnny on GMA 7
Ang Say Mo... Mahalaga! on GMA 7
Just for Fun on GMA 7
Veritas Monitors on GMA 7
Agos on RPN 9
Charo on RPN 9
Co-Ed Blues on RPN 9
Lotlot & Friends on RPN 9
Maricel Live! on RPN 9
Plaza 1899 on RPN 9
Showbiz Talk of the Town on RPN 9
Simply Snooky on RPN 9
Stir on RPN 9
Teenage Diary on RPN 9
Verdadero on RPN 9
2+2=4 on PTV 4Bantay Kongreso on PTV 4Meet the Press on PTV 4Oks na Oks on PTV 4

Births
January 6 – Mikael Daez, actor, basketball player and TV commercial, print and ramp model
January 16 – Alex Gonzaga, TV host, actress
January 21 – Glaiza de Castro, singer, actress
January 27 – Miguel Mendoza, singer, actor
February 18 – C. J. Muere, actor, TV host
March 2 – Nadine Samonte, actress and model
March 6 – Isabelle Daza, actress and model
March 9 – Alodia Gosiengfiao
March 13 – Benjamin Belarmino, actor and TV Host
April 2 – Ellen Adarna, actress and model
April 6 – Melai Cantiveros
April 24 – Jinri Park, actress, model and radio DJ
April 26 – Hazel Ann Mendoza, actress
May 12 – Marky Cielo, actor and dancer (d. 2008)
May 13 – Paulo Avelino, actor and dancer
May 20 – Madeleine Humphries, actress and model
May 23 – Vaness del Moral, actress
June 2 – Chuck Allie, actor, dancer and TV Host
June 11 – Gabriel Valenciano, actor and dancer
June 15 – Kevin Santos, actor and TV Host
July 7 – Venus Raj, Miss Universe 2010, 4th runner–up
July 22 – Renz Ongkiko, news anchor model and journalist
July 25 – Sarah Geronimo, singer, actress and television host
August 11 – Benjamin Benj'' Pacia, Broadcaster, TV Personality (former actor)
August 24 – Helga Krapf, actress
August 26 – Niña Jose, actress
August 29 – Iwa Moto, actress and model
September 2 – Jeric Rizalado, Broadcaster and TV Personality (former actor)
October 4 – Joseph Marco, actor
October 5 – Maja Salvador, singer, actress
November 10 – Pauleen Luna, TV host, actress and wife of Vic Sotto
November 19 – JC Santos, actor
November 20 – Ariella Arida, Miss Universe 2013, 3rd runner–up
November 28 – Daniel Matsunaga, actor and model
December 4 – Yeng Constantino, singer
December 14 – Eda Nolan, actress

Deaths
September 30 – Chino Roces, founder of ABC 5 (b. 1913)

References

See also
1988 in television

 
Philippine television-related lists
Television in the Philippines by year